Swan River 150E is a Cree First Nation reserve in Kinuso, Alberta, Canada.

References 

Indian reserves in Alberta